Joseph Daniell Hoague (February 18, 1918 – January 4, 1991) was a professional American football player in the National Football League with the Pittsburgh Steelers, and later the Philadelphia-Pittsburgh Steagles, and the Boston Yanks. Prior to joining the NFL, Hoague played college football at Colgate University.

Early career
Hoague began his athletic career while attending The Governor's Academy, the oldest boarding school in the United States. There he played five varsity sports serving as captain of the baseball team his senior year. In his junior year, Hoague played football, hockey, and baseball; as a senior, he competed in football, basketball, winter track, and baseball. While at the school he was also awarded the Academy’s most honored prize, the Morse Flag, for earning the highest respect of the faculty.

College
Hoague graduated in 1937 and so afterwards attended Colgate University. At Colgate, he was a three-year letterman and honorable All-American. He was inducted into the Colgate University Hall of Honor in 1990.

Pro football
After college, he was drafted by the Philadelphia Eagles in the 13th round (111th overall) of the 1941 NFL Draft. His rights were transferred to the Pittsburgh Steelers due to the events later referred to as the Pennsylvania Polka. He played in two seasons with the Steelers. However, he was later called up to fight in World War II. He was drafted into the United States Navy and was out of football until 1946, when he played one last season with the Boston Yanks. However, before he left for the Navy, Steagles coach Walt Kiesling placed Hoague in the line-up once last time in a game against the Chicago Bears.

Coaching career
In 1980, Hoague was named to the National High School Association Hall of Fame for his dedication to coaching football at Melrose High School in Melrose, Massachusetts. Hoague achieved a combined record of 200 victories as a high school football coach at Melrose, Natick and Taunton High Schools. He also received recognition by his induction into the Massachusetts Football Coaches Hall of Fame.

References

External links
Governor's Academy profile
Friends of Melrose Football
Last Team Standing

1918 births
1991 deaths
Sportspeople from Brookline, Massachusetts
United States Navy personnel of World War II
Players of American football from Massachusetts
Boston Yanks players
Pittsburgh Steelers players
Steagles players and personnel
Colgate Raiders football players
The Governor's Academy alumni